Raymond Moscrop Brown ( 11 February 1928 - 2005) was an English footballer, who played for Queen's Park, Notts County, Third Lanark, Dumbarton, Dunfermline Athletic and Cowdenbeath.

References

1928 births
2005 deaths
English footballers
Queen's Park F.C. players
Notts County F.C. players
Third Lanark A.C. players
Dumbarton F.C. players
Dunfermline Athletic F.C. players
Cowdenbeath F.C. players
Scottish Football League players
English Football League players
Footballers from Carlisle, Cumbria
Association football wingers
Scotland amateur international footballers